Song Yong-hun (born 13 January 1972) is a North Korean speed skater. He competed in two events at the 1988 Winter Olympics.

References

External links
 

1972 births
Living people
North Korean male speed skaters
Olympic speed skaters of North Korea
Speed skaters at the 1988 Winter Olympics
Place of birth missing (living people)
Speed skaters at the 1990 Asian Winter Games